Statistics of Belgian First Division in the 1904–05 season.

Overview

This season saw the two Groups merged back into one National Division: this was also the last season before promotion and relegation was introduced with the creation of the "Promotion" Division.
It was contested by 11 teams, and Union Saint-Gilloise won the championship.

League standings

Results

See also
1904–05 in Belgian football

References

Belgian Pro League seasons
Belgian First Division, 1913-14
1904–05 in Belgian football